Emerald Township may refer to the following townships in the United States:

 Emerald Township, Faribault County, Minnesota
 Emerald Township, Paulding County, Ohio